The Indonesian National Populist Fortress Party was a political party in Indonesia. The founder, Eros Djarot was dissatisfied with the Indonesian Democratic Party – Struggle, which refused to allow him to stand as chairman against Megawati Sukarnoputri at the party conference in 2000. Eros then formed the Bung Karno National Party, named after Indonesia's first president Sukarno. However, as the law did not allow the use of national figures in party names, this was changed to the Freedom Bull National Party (with the same initials – PNBK – in Indonesian).

In the 2004 legislative elections in the party won 1.1% of the popular vote and 1 out of 550 seats in the People's Representative Council. In the 2009 elections, the party stood as the Indonesian National Populist Fortress Party. It won 0.45 percent of the vote, less than the 2.5 percent electoral threshold, and lost its only seat in the People's Representative Council. Following its poor result in the 2009 vote, the party joined nine other smaller parties to form the National Unity Party.

References

2002 establishments in Indonesia
Defunct political parties in Indonesia
Defunct socialist parties in Asia
Political parties established in 2002
Political parties with year of disestablishment missing
Socialist parties in Indonesia